The superior rectal plexus (or superior hemorrhoidal plexus) supplies the rectum and joins in the pelvis with branches from the pelvic plexuses.

The superior rectal plexus is a division of the inferior mesenteric plexus.

References

External links
 

Nerve plexus
Nerves of the torso